The following is a partial list of the "C" codes for Medical Subject Headings (MeSH), as defined by the United States National Library of Medicine (NLM).

This list continues the information at List of MeSH codes (B08). Codes following these are found at List of MeSH codes (C02). For other MeSH codes, see List of MeSH codes.

The source for this content is the set of 2020 MeSH Trees from the NLM.

– Infections

MeSH C01.069 Aneurysm, Infected

MeSH C01.100 Arthritis, Infectious 
MeSH C01.100.500 Arthritis, Reactive

MeSH C01.125 Asymptomatic Infections

MeSH C01.150 Bacterial Infections and Mycoses

 MeSH C01.150.252 Bacterial Infections
 MeSH C01.150.703 Mycoses

MeSH C01.160 Bone Diseases, Infectious 

 MeSH C01.160.495 Osteomyelitis
 MeSH C01.160.495.500 Mastoiditis
 MeSH C01.160.495.750 Petrositis
 MeSH C01.160.495.875 Pott Puffy Tumor
 MeSH C01.160.595 Periostitis
 MeSH C01.160.762 Spondylitis
 MeSH C01.762.301 Discitis
 MeSH C01.160.886 Tuberculosis, Osteoarticular
 MeSH C01.160.886.722 Tuberculosis, Spinal

MeSH C01.190 Cardiovascular Infections 

 MeSH C01.190.249 Endocarditis, Bacterial
 MeSH C01.190.249.407 Endocarditis, Subacute Bacterial
 MeSH C01.190.500 Syphilis, Cardiovascular
 MeSH C01.190.750 Tuberculosis, Cardiovascular
 MeSH C01.190.7500.595 Pericarditis, Tuberculosis

MeSH C01.195 Catheter-Related Infections

MeSH C01.207 Central Nervous System Infections 

 MeSH C01.207.090 Brain Abscess
 MeSH C01.207.090.800 Toxoplasmosis, Cerebral

– bacteremia
  – hemorrhagic septicemia

– central nervous system bacterial infections
  – brain abscess
  – empyema, subdural
  – epidural abscess
  – lyme neuroborreliosis
  – meningitis, bacterial
  – meningitis, escherichia coli
  – meningitis, haemophilus
  – meningitis, listeria
  – meningitis, meningococcal
  – waterhouse-friderichsen syndrome
  – meningitis, pneumococcal
  – tuberculosis, meningeal
  – neurosyphilis

– endocarditis, bacterial
  – endocarditis, subacute bacterial

– eye infections, bacterial
  – conjunctivitis, bacterial
  – conjunctivitis, inclusion
  – ophthalmia neonatorum
  – trachoma
  – hordeolum
  – keratoconjunctivitis, infectious
  – tuberculosis, ocular
  – uveitis, suppurative
  – endophthalmitis
  – panophthalmitis

– fournier gangrene

– gram-negative bacterial infections
  – anaplasmataceae infections
  – anaplasmosis
  – ehrlichiosis
  – heartwater disease
  – bacteroidaceae infections
  – bacteroides infections
  – bartonellaceae infections
  – bartonella infections
  – angiomatosis, bacillary
  – cat-scratch disease
  – trench fever
  – bordetella infections
  – whooping cough
  – borrelia infections
  – lyme disease
  – erythema chronicum migrans
  – lyme neuroborreliosis
  – relapsing fever
  – brucellosis
  – brucellosis, bovine
  – burkholderia infections
  – glanders
  – melioidosis
  – campylobacter infections
  – cat-scratch disease
  – chlamydiaceae infections
  – chlamydia infections
  – conjunctivitis, inclusion
  – lymphogranuloma venereum
  – trachoma
  – chlamydophila infections
  – psittacosis
  – desulfovibrionaceae infections
  – enterobacteriaceae infections
  – dysentery, bacillary
  – escherichia coli infections
  – meningitis, escherichia coli
  – granuloma inguinale
  – klebsiella infections
  – rhinoscleroma
  – proteus infections
  – salmonella infections
  – paratyphoid fever
  – salmonella food poisoning
  – salmonella infections, animal
  – typhoid fever
  – serratia infections
  – yersinia infections
  – plague
  – yersinia pseudotuberculosis infections
  – flavobacteriaceae infections
  – flexibacteraceae infections
  – fusobacteriaceae infections
  – fusobacterium infections
  – gingivitis, necrotizing ulcerative
  – rat-bite fever
  – helicobacter infections
  – legionellosis
  – legionnaires' disease
  – leptospirosis
  – weil disease
  – moraxellaceae infections
  – acinetobacter infections
  – mycoplasmatales infections
  – mycoplasma infections
  – pleuropneumonia, contagious
  – pneumonia, mycoplasma
  – ureaplasma infections
  – neisseriaceae infections
  – gonorrhea
  – ophthalmia neonatorum
  – meningococcal infections
  – meningitis, meningococcal
  – waterhouse-friderichsen syndrome
  – pasteurellaceae infections
  – actinobacillus infections
  – actinobacillosis
  – haemophilus infections
  – chancroid
  – meningitis, haemophilus
  – pasteurella infections
  – hemorrhagic septicemia
  – pasteurellosis, pneumonic
  – piscirickettsiaceae infections
  – pseudomonas infections
  – q fever
  – rat-bite fever
  – rickettsiaceae infections
  – pneumonia, rickettsial
  – rickettsia infections
  – boutonneuse fever
  – rocky mountain spotted fever
  – typhus, endemic flea-borne
  – typhus, epidemic louse-borne
  – scrub typhus
  – tick-borne diseases
  – anaplasmosis
  – boutonneuse fever
  – ehrlichiosis
  – heartwater disease
  – lyme disease
  – erythema chronicum migrans
  – lyme neuroborreliosis
  – relapsing fever
  – rocky mountain spotted fever
  – tularemia
  – treponemal infections
  – pinta
  – syphilis
  – chancre
  – neurosyphilis
  – tabes dorsalis
  – syphilis, cardiovascular
  – syphilis, congenital
  – syphilis, cutaneous
  – syphilis, latent
  – yaws
  – tularemia
  – vibrio infections
  – cholera

– gram-positive bacterial infections
  – actinomycetales infections
  – actinomycosis
  – actinomycosis, cervicofacial
  – whipple disease
  – corynebacterium infections
  – diphtheria
  – erythrasma
  – mycobacterium infections
  – leprosy
  – leprosy, borderline
  – leprosy, lepromatous
  – leprosy, tuberculoid
  – mycobacterium infections, atypical
  – mycobacterium avium-intracellulare infection
  – paratuberculosis
  – tuberculosis
  – peritonitis, tuberculous
  – tuberculoma
  – tuberculoma, intracranial
  – tuberculosis, avian
  – tuberculosis, bovine
  – tuberculosis, cardiovascular
  – pericarditis, tuberculous
  – tuberculosis, central nervous system
  – tuberculoma, intracranial
  – tuberculosis, meningeal
  – tuberculosis, cutaneous
  – erythema induratum
  – lupus
  – tuberculosis, endocrine
  – tuberculosis, gastrointestinal
  – tuberculosis, hepatic
  – tuberculosis, laryngeal
  – tuberculosis, lymph node
  – king's evil
  – tuberculosis, miliary
  – tuberculosis, multidrug-resistant
  – tuberculosis, ocular
  – tuberculosis, oral
  – tuberculosis, osteoarticular
  – tuberculosis, spinal
  – tuberculosis, pleural
  – empyema, tuberculous
  – tuberculosis, pulmonary
  – silicotuberculosis
  – tuberculosis, splenic
  – tuberculosis, urogenital
  – tuberculosis, female genital
  – tuberculosis, male genital
  – tuberculosis, renal
  – nocardia infections
  – maduromycosis
  – bacillaceae infections
  – anthrax
  – bifidobacteriales infections
  – clostridium infections
  – botulism
  – enterocolitis, pseudomembranous
  – enterotoxemia
  – gas gangrene
  – tetanus
  – erysipelothrix infections
  – erysipeloid
  – swine erysipelas
  – listeria infections
  – meningitis, listeria
  – staphylococcal infections
  – pneumonia, staphylococcal
  – staphylococcal food poisoning
  – staphylococcal skin infections
  – furunculosis
  – carbuncle
  – impetigo
  – staphylococcal scalded skin syndrome
  – streptococcal infections
  – ecthyma
  – endocarditis, subacute bacterial
  – erysipelas
  – fasciitis, necrotizing
  – impetigo
  – pneumococcal infections
  – meningitis, pneumococcal
  – pneumonia, pneumococcal
  – rheumatic fever
  – rheumatic heart disease
  – scarlet fever

– pneumonia, bacterial
  – pneumonia, mycoplasma
  – pneumonia of calves, enzootic
  – pneumonia of swine, mycoplasmal
  – pneumonia, pneumococcal
  – pneumonia, rickettsial
  – pneumonia, staphylococcal

– sexually transmitted diseases, bacterial
  – chancroid
  – chlamydia infections
  – lymphogranuloma venereum
  – gonorrhea
  – granuloma inguinale
  – syphilis

– skin diseases, bacterial
  – actinomycosis, cervicofacial
  – angiomatosis, bacillary
  – ecthyma
  – erysipelas
  – erythema chronicum migrans
  – erythrasma
  – granuloma inguinale
  – hidradenitis suppurativa
  – maduromycosis
  – pinta
  – rhinoscleroma
  – staphylococcal skin infections
  – furunculosis
  – carbuncle
  – impetigo
  – staphylococcal scalded skin syndrome
  – syphilis, cutaneous
  – tuberculosis, cutaneous
  – erythema induratum
  – lupus
  – yaws

– spirochaetales infections
  – borrelia infections
  – lyme disease
  – erythema chronicum migrans
  – lyme neuroborreliosis
  – relapsing fever
  – leptospirosis
  – weil disease
  – treponemal infections
  – pinta
  – syphilis
  – chancre
  – neurosyphilis
  – tabes dorsalis
  – syphilis, cardiovascular
  – syphilis, congenital
  – syphilis, cutaneous
  – syphilis, latent
  – yaws

– vaginosis, bacterial

– brain abscess

– toxoplasmosis, cerebral

– central nervous system infections

– central nervous system bacterial infections

– empyema, subdural

– infection

– aneurysm, infected

– arthritis, infectious
  – arthritis, reactive

– bone diseases, infectious
  – osteitis
  – osteomyelitis
  – periostitis
  – spondylitis
  – discitis
  – tuberculosis, osteoarticular
  – tuberculosis, spinal

– communicable diseases
  – communicable diseases, emerging

– community-acquired infections

– cross infection

– eye infections
  – corneal ulcer
  – eye infections, bacterial
  – conjunctivitis, bacterial
  – conjunctivitis, inclusion
  – ophthalmia neonatorum
  – trachoma
  – hordeolum
  – keratoconjunctivitis, infectious
  – tuberculosis, ocular
  – uveitis, suppurative
  – endophthalmitis
  – panophthalmitis
  – eye infections, fungal
  – uveitis, suppurative
  – endophthalmitis
  – panophthalmitis

– focal infection
  – focal infection, dental

– gingivitis, necrotizing ulcerative

– laboratory infection

– ludwig's angina

– opportunistic infections
  – aids-related opportunistic infections
  – superinfection

– pelvic infection
  – pelvic inflammatory disease

– pregnancy complications, infectious
  – abortion, septic
  – puerperal infection

– prosthesis-related infections

– reiter disease

– respiratory tract infections
  – empyema, pleural
  – empyema, tuberculous
  – whooping cough

– sepsis
  – septicemia
  – bacteremia
  – hemorrhagic septicemia
  – fungemia
  – parasitemia
  – sepsis syndrome
  – shock, septic
  – viremia

– sexually transmitted diseases
  – sexually transmitted diseases, bacterial
  – chancroid
  – chlamydia infections
  – lymphogranuloma venereum
  – gonorrhea
  – granuloma inguinale
  – syphilis

– skin diseases, infectious
  – cellulitis
  – dermatomycoses
  – blastomycosis
  – candidiasis, chronic mucocutaneous
  – candidiasis, cutaneous
  – chromoblastomycosis
  – maduromycosis
  – paracoccidioidomycosis
  – sporotrichosis
  – tinea
  – onychomycosis
  – tinea capitis
  – tinea favosa
  – tinea pedis
  – tinea versicolor
  – paronychia
  – skin diseases, bacterial
  – actinomycosis, cervicofacial
  – angiomatosis, bacillary
  – ecthyma
  – erysipelas
  – erythema chronicum migrans
  – erythrasma
  – granuloma inguinale
  – hidradenitis suppurativa
  – maduromycosis
  – pinta
  – rhinoscleroma
  – staphylococcal skin infections
  – furunculosis
  – carbuncle
  – impetigo
  – staphylococcal scalded skin syndrome
  – syphilis, cutaneous
  – tuberculosis, cutaneous
  – erythema induratum
  – lupus
  – yaws

– soft tissue infections

– suppuration
  – abscess
  – abdominal abscess
  – liver abscess
  – liver abscess, amebic
  – liver abscess, pyogenic
  – subphrenic abscess
  – brain abscess
  – toxoplasmosis, cerebral
  – epidural abscess
  – lung abscess
  – periapical abscess
  – periodontal abscess
  – peritonsillar abscess
  – psoas abscess
  – retropharyngeal abscess
  – cellulitis
  – empyema
  – empyema, pleural
  – empyema, tuberculous
  – empyema, subdural
  – otitis media, suppurative
  – thyroiditis, suppurative
  – uveitis, suppurative

– toxemia
  – endotoxemia

– urinary tract infections
  – bacteriuria
  – pyuria
  – schistosomiasis haematobia

– wound infection
  – surgical wound infection

– mycoses

– aspergillosis
  – aspergillosis, allergic bronchopulmonary
  – neuroaspergillosis

– blastomycosis

– candidiasis
  – candidiasis, chronic mucocutaneous
  – candidiasis, cutaneous
  – candidiasis, oral
  – candidiasis, vulvovaginal

– central nervous system fungal infections
  – meningitis, fungal
  – meningitis, cryptococcal

– coccidioidomycosis

– cryptococcosis
  – meningitis, cryptococcal

– dermatomycoses
  – blastomycosis
  – candidiasis, chronic mucocutaneous
  – candidiasis, cutaneous
  – chromoblastomycosis
  – maduromycosis
  – paracoccidioidomycosis
  – sporotrichosis
  – tinea
  – onychomycosis
  – tinea capitis
  – tinea favosa
  – tinea pedis
  – tinea versicolor

– eye infections, fungal
  – uveitis, suppurative
  – endophthalmitis
  – panophthalmitis

– fungemia

– geotrichosis

– histoplasmosis

– lung diseases, fungal
  – aspergillosis, allergic bronchopulmonary
  – pneumonia, pneumocystis

– microsporidiosis
  – encephalitozoonosis

– paracoccidioidomycosis

– piedra

– Pneumocystis Infections
  – pneumonia, pneumocystis

– rhinosporidiosis

– zygomycosis
  – mucormycosis

– zoonoses

The list continues at List of MeSH codes (C02).

C01